The following is a list of Nippon Professional Baseball players with the last name starting with L, retired or active.

L

References

External links
Japanese Baseball

 L